The Jefferson Theater, a former movie palace, is a performing arts venue located at 110 East Main Street in Charlottesville, Virginia, and is the centerpiece of the Historic Downtown Mall.

Built in 1912, this combination vaudeville house/cinema is one of the major performing venues in Charlottesville, Virginia. Operated most recently as one of the dollar theaters, it is currently owned by Coran Capshaw, who oversaw restoration which has now been completed.

It was designed by architect C.K. Howell, who also designed the November Theatre in nearby Richmond, Virginia.

Before closing for renovations in the spring of 2006, one of the final performances was a concert by the Charlottesville-based bluegrass band, King Wilkie.

References

External links
Official Site
 "Jefferson Theater stops $3 flix"
"Star reborn: Jefferson readied for next act"

Buildings and structures in Charlottesville, Virginia
Theatres in Virginia
Tourist attractions in Charlottesville, Virginia
1912 establishments in Virginia
Buildings and structures completed in 1912